Morrison's Cafeterias was a chain of cafeteria-style restaurants, located in the Southeastern United States with a concentration of locations in Georgia and Florida. Generally found in shopping malls, Morrison's primary competition was Piccadilly Cafeterias. It was especially popular in Florida, with its high proportion of retirees. At its peak, the company was a symbol of good Southern cooking and operated 151 restaurants under the Morrison's name in 13 states.

The company began as a single cafeteria opened in 1920 in Mobile, Alabama by J. A. Morrison. Morrison helped develop the cafeteria dining concept, which was unique at the time and would later become characteristic of the Southern United States. More than 100 food items were prepared "homemade" daily. By 1950 the company had 17 locations in Mississippi, Alabama, Louisiana, Georgia, Tennessee, and Florida, with the majority of them in Florida.

Morrison's steadily expanded throughout the Southeast over the next two decades, eventually becoming the nation's largest cafeteria chain. After winning a contract to cater to the cast and crew of the film The Greatest Show on Earth, Morrison's branched out into catering contracts for schools, including state universities such as Florida State University in Tallahassee, Stetson University in DeLand, corporate dining facilities, and hospitals.

Morrison's Cafeterias were founded and operated as a racially-segregated private business.  Its restaurants served only white people.  As part of the "Southern tradition," the restaurant employed black men as waiters to carry the customers' trays to their tables.  In Nashville, for example, most restaurants agreed to serve non-whites in the early 1960s in response to the civil rights movement, but Morrison's stubbornly refused.  Civil rights demonstrations led by John Lewis were held at Morrison's Cafeteria in Nashville in 1964, with police attacking peaceful protesters in front of the restaurant.  The governor of Tennessee called the president of Morrison's to beg him to desegregate his restaurants, but he refused saying he would never serve blacks.  A group of whites brought black guests to the restaurant, and the manager had them all arrested.  About 95 peaceful demonstrators were arrested inside and outside of Morrison's that week.  Morrison's management then obtained a court injunction against Lewis and others to prevent further civil rights demonstrations against the company. 

Its effort to diversify into non-dining businesses in the 1960s was less successful, and those enterprises were sold off in the early 1980s by new management. In 1982, Morrison's acquired the 15-unit Ruby Tuesday chain. It used this acquisition to launch other casual dining concepts, such as L&N Seafood Grill, Silver Spoon Café, Mozzarella's, and Tia's Tex-Mex. It also acquired three other food-contract firms.

By the mid-1990s, the new restaurant concepts — particularly Ruby Tuesday — were doing far better than the original cafeteria chain, as customers' expectations and tastes had changed. Because of this, Morrison's decided to split the company into three new firms: Morrison's Fresh Cooking, the cafeteria chain; Ruby Tuesday, Inc., which also included the other casual dining concepts; and Morrison Health Care, which took over the food contracts for hospitals (the educational and business contracts had been previously sold to a competitor). Morrison Health Care is now part of Compass Group.

In 1998, Morrison's Fresh Cooking — unable to withstand the loss in popularity of cafeterias in general — sold out to Piccadilly Cafeterias. Piccadilly has since closed numerous former Morrison's locations outside of Florida and Georgia.

Piccadilly — which went through Chapter 11 bankruptcy proceedings in 2012 and has reduced its footprint to 41 locations as of February 2019 — maintains one location branded as a Morrison's Cafeteria in the former chain's hometown of Mobile.

External links
 Morrison's company history, from International Directory of Company Histories, Vol. 11., St. James Press, 1995; posted at FundingUniverse.com

References

Companies based in Mobile, Alabama
Restaurants established in 1920
Defunct restaurant chains in the United States
Cafeteria-style restaurants
Companies disestablished in 1998
1920 establishments in Alabama
1998 disestablishments in Georgia (U.S. state)